The table below is a list of United States Navy ships named after US states. The practice of naming commissioned ships for US states and territories dates back to the Continental Navy during the time of the American Revolution. The conventions for naming ships of the US Navy were made law in 1862; 

A large majority of the ships named for states are battleships (BB), followed by submarines (SSN, SSBN & SSGN). The remainder are cruisers (ACR & CGN), monitors (BM) and patrol craft (SP) and an amphibious transport dock (LPD).

As of March 2021, thirty-seven ships currently in commission are named after US states and one is named after a territory. Eleven states and one territory have been announced as names for ships that are under construction or authorized. Two state names (Kansas and South Carolina) and four populated territories (American Samoa, Guam, the Northern Mariana Islands, and the US Virgin Islands) are not currently planned for use.

The , which envisions a class size of 66 attack submarines, is the most recent class to use state names, with 28 of the active and announced boats being named after US states, though that convention appears to have changed.

States

Territories and Federal District

See also
United States ship naming conventions

References
Naval Vessel Register online at www.nvr.navy.mil.

States